The Next Big Thing was a radio series produced at WNYC in New York City, and syndicated nationally in the U.S. by Public Radio International.  It was offered nationally after the success of PRI's Chicago-based This American Life, which it somewhat resembles; one distinction is that TNBT is more likely to be given over to one documentary or radio drama segment per episode.  This show is no longer airing on WNYC, where it began in 1999 and transmitted its last episode in January, 2006.  Archives are still available on the WNYC website.

External links
The Next Big Thing - Archive
The Next Big Thing program from August 19th, 2001 at WNYC

Public Radio International programs

1999 radio programme debuts 
2006 radio programme endings